The 2012–13 Leyton Orient F.C. season was the 114th season in the history of Leyton Orient Football Club, their 97th in the Football League, and seventh consecutive season in the third tier of the English football league system.

Playing staff
Defender Elliott Omozusi's first contract with Leyton Orient was terminated in November 2011 due to his criminal conviction and subsequent prison sentence. In January 2013 after his release from prison, he re-signed for the club having trained with the first team for a short period.

Statistics include League, FA Cup, League Cup and Football League Trophy appearances and goals

Transfers

Kehagias vasilis from academy

2012–13 squad statistics

Figures in brackets indicate appearances as a substitute
Players in italics are loan players

Top scorers

Results

Pre-season friendlies

League One

Results by round

FA Cup

League Cup

Football League Trophy

League One table

References

Leyton Orient F.C. seasons
Leyton Orient